Minkailu Bah (died 18 May 2020, Magburaka, Tonkolili District) was a Sierra Leonean politician and lecturer.

He served as Sierra Leone's Minister of Education, Youth and Sports. Born in Magburaka, he was the acting head of the Electrical and Electronics department at Fourah Bay College, University of Sierra Leone before his appointment as a minister.

Bah died from COVID-19 in 2020.

External links
 http://www.afdevinfo.com/htmlreports/peo/peo_41445.aspx

Year of birth missing
2020 deaths
Government ministers of Sierra Leone
Education ministers
People from Tonkolili District
Deaths from the COVID-19 pandemic in Sierra Leone